Jan Harmenszoon Krul (1601–1646) was a Dutch Catholic playwright. His portrait was painted in 1633 by Rembrandt. Krul founded the Amsterdamsche Musijck Kamer, devoted to the cultivation of music drama.

Works
The emblem book Minne-spiegel ter Deughden (Amsterdam, 1639)
The Pastoral Music-Play of Juliana and Claudiaen.

References

External links

1601 births
1646 deaths
17th-century Dutch dramatists and playwrights
Writers from Amsterdam
Dutch male dramatists and playwrights